The Hadith of the Ark is a saying (hadith) attributed to the Islamic prophet Muhammad that likens his household (Ahl al-Bayt) to Noah's Ark; whoever turns to them is saved and whoever turns away from them perishes. Reported by both Shia and Sunni authorities, this hadith is of particular significance in Shia Islam, where the Ahl al-Bayt are viewed as the spiritual and political successors of Muhammad.

Hadith of the Ark
In his Chalyat al-maram, Bahrani cites eleven chains of transmission for this hadith in Sunni sources and seven from Shia sources. In particular, the Sunni al-Nishapuri in his al-Mustadrak includes the following version of the hadith:

Similar versions of the hadith also appear in the works of the Sunni Ibn Hajar, Ibn Abdullah Tabari, al-Suyuti, Shiblanil and the contemporary Shah-Kazemi. The Shia Tabatabai narrates this hadith on the authority of Ibn Abbas.

Ahl al-Bayt 

Muslims disagree as to who belong to the Ahl al-Bayt, a term which also appears in verse 33:33 of the Quran, also known as the Verse of Purification. Shia Islam limits the Ahl al-Bayt to the Ahl al-Kisa, namely, Muhammad, his daughter Fatima, her husband Ali, and their two sons, Hasan and Husayn. There are various views in Sunni Islam, though a typical compromise is to include also Muhammad's wives in the Ahl al-Bayt. The Ahl al-Bayt also refers to the remaining Shia Imams in Shia theology works.

Inclusion of the Ahl al-Kisa 
The majority of the traditions quoted by al-Tabari in his exegesis identify the Ahl al-Bayt in the Verse of Purification with the Ahl al-Kisa, namely, Muhammad, Ali, Fatima, Hasan, and Husayn. These traditions are also cited by some other early Sunni authorities, including Ahmad ibn Hanbal, al-Suyuti, al-Hafiz al-Kabir, and Ibn Kathir. The canonical Sunni collection Sunnan al-Tirmidhi reports that Muhammad limited the Ahl al-Bayt to Ali, Fatima, and their two sons when the Verse of Purification was revealed to him. In the Event of Mubahala, Muhammad is believed to have gathered these four under his cloak and referred to them as the Ahl al-Bayt, according to Shia and some Sunni sources, including the canonical Sahih Muslim and Sunan al-Tirmidhi. Veccia Vaglieri writes that Muhammad recited the Verse of Purification every morning when he passed by Fatima's house to remind them of the  prayer. This makeup of the Ahl al-Bayt is echoed by Veccia Vaglieri and Jafri, and unanimously reported in Shia sources.

Inclusion of Muhammad's wives 
Possibly because the earlier injunctions in the Verse of Purification are addressed at Muhammad's wives, some Sunni authors, such as Ibn Kathir, include Muhammad's wives in the Ahl al-Bayt. A number of Sunni hadiths also support the inclusion of Muhammad's wives in the Ahl al-Bayt. This view is shared by Goldziher and his coauthors. Alternatively, Leaman argues that only those wives of prophets who mother their successors are counted by the Quran in their .

Significance in Shia Islam
Rather than an issue settled by the people, the Hadith of Ark for the Shia Sobhani suggests that the divine leadership of the Muslim community rests with the Ahl al-Bayt to save the community from "delusion and confusion." He also views this hadith as evidence of the infallibility of the Ahl al-Bayt. The Shia Tabatabai similarly cites this and related hadiths to support the significance of the Ahl al-Bayt in Islam. 

Shah-Kazemi cites verse 29:64 of the Quran, "the abode of hereafter---that is the true life, if only they knew," to suggest that being saved in this hadith refers to salvation, namely, entering the paradise in the hereafter and everything in this world that contributes to that outcome. In particular, he writes, being saved does not mean being spared the trials and afflictions of this world; it instead means being granted the capacity to endure these trials and afflictions. He thus concludes that the saving ark in this hadith is piety achieved by following the teachings of Muhammad and the Ahl al-Bayt. With , he adds, we are thereby shielded from anxiety, misery, and terror when hit by the calamities of this world.

See also
Hadith al-Thaqalayn
Hadith of Golden Chain
Hadith of Warning
Ghadir Khumm

References

Sources

External links
HADITH AL-SAFINAH: ANALYSIS
HADITH AL-SAFINAH: THE NARRATIONS
HADITH AL-SAFINAH: THE VIEWS OF THE SCHOLARS
Peshawar Nights
Taharah & 'Ismah of The Prophets, Messengers, Awsiya
Imamah and Wilayah 
Safinah Tradition

Hadith